Flyin' B Airport  is an airport located in unincorporated Brazoria County, Texas, United States. The airport is located near Pearland.

The airport is privately owned by Ned Lewis Beaman.

References

External links 

Defunct airports in Texas
Airports in Texas
Airports in Greater Houston
Buildings and structures in Brazoria County, Texas
Transportation in Brazoria County, Texas